Soné Masué Kallé (born 5 December 1982 in Limbe, Cameroon), commonly known as  Kallé Soné, is a Cameroonian football player, who is currently playing for Kuala Lumpur FA. 2018 he signed by Texas based side, Fort Worth Vaqueros Fc the side competed in America's NPSL (National Premier Soccer League) 4th tier in US soccer pyramid.

Career 
He started his career at Victoria United Limbé before he was spotted at a youth tournament in France with the Cameroonian youth squad by Jan Streuer who brought him alongside Job Komol and Émile Mbamba in the Vitesse Arnhem youth-academy in The Netherlands in 1997. In 2004, he left the team and moved to Israeli club Hapoel Nazareth Illit F.C.

He played 2 years in Israel before signing a contract in Romania with Unirea Urziceni. Barely after 6 months precisely in January 2007, he left Unirea and moved to FCM Campina. He played 6 months for FCM Câmpina before moving to CS Otopeni in July 2007.

In 2011, he was signed by the Malaysian side club Sarawak FA alongside fellow countrymen, Guy Bwele for the 2012 Malaysia Super League Campaign with a fee almost €31.4 million.  However, due to an injury he sustained, Kallé only managed to play a game and scored a goal with Sarawak and later was released by Sarawak FA. He was replaced by Croatian striker, Vedran Muratović.

References

External links
 

1982 births
Cameroonian footballers
Expatriate footballers in the Netherlands
SBV Vitesse players
Expatriate footballers in Romania
CS Otopeni players
FC Unirea Urziceni players
Liga I players
Hapoel Nof HaGalil F.C. players
Expatriate footballers in Israel
Living people
Cameroonian expatriate sportspeople in Romania
FCM Câmpina players
Sarawak FA players
Association football forwards